Vishu Bhatnagar better known by his stage name Kumar Vishu is an Indian devotional playback singer whose songs have been featured primarily in Hindi devotional movies and television serials. He has sung more than  200 devotional albums with the leading singers of India and major records labels of India including T-Series, HMV, Venus, Sonotek & KVC music, Saregama and other record labels.

Vishu has received President Award, Cinema Century Award and others. He has also sung in several languages including Punjabi, Rajasthani and other Indian languages and was signed by the T-series for seven years.

Biography
Vishu is known for a melodious style of singing bhajans, devotional music, Ghazals and Sundarkaand recital. His album Ramayan ki Choupaiyan and Pyaase ko paani pilaya nahi with T-Series has been the best seller in the devotional album category. Some of his major songs include Kabhi Pyase Ko Paani Pilaya Nahi, Khazaana Maiya Ka, Ghar Ghar Main Hai Raavan Baitha, Udd Ja Hans Akela, Kabir Amrit Vaani, Hanuman Gatha, Karmo Ki Hai Maaya and others.

He has given several stage performances in India and abroad, has emerged as a popular devotional singer. Apart from his singing, he has also founded a singing and instrumental training institute.

Selected bhajans

Solo albums

Albums

Accolades

 President Award
 Cinema Century Award 
 Rajdhani Ratan
 Bhajan Samraat
 Bhakt Shiromani

References

External links
 

Bhajan singers
Living people
Bollywood playback singers
Indian male singers
Year of birth missing (living people)
Place of birth missing (living people)